The war in Afghanistan ended with the Taliban victory when the United States withdrew its troops from Afghanistan. The aftermath has been characterized by marked change in the social and political order of Afghanistan as Taliban took over the country once again after the fall of Kabul in 2021. 

The aftermath has included the disintegration of the US-trained and funded Afghan Army, and a humanitarian and economic crisis due to the effects of the war, suspension of foreign aid, frozen monetary assets, and drought. Conflict has continued in Afghanistan, with the continuing conflict with the Islamic State, and a Republican insurgency against the Taliban in multiple provinces.

Aftermath

Collapse of Afghan Army

Following the withdrawal of NATO troops from Afghanistan in the summer of 2021, in addition to a rapid offensive conducted by the Taliban, the Afghan National Army largely disintegrated, due to devastatingly low morale and massive corruption, with large numbers of ANA soldiers abandoning their posts or surrendering en masse to the Taliban, allowing the Taliban to capture large quantities of US-provided military equipment, vehicles and aircraft. Soon, all the regional forces of the ANA had dissolved, with the exception of the 201st Corps and the 111th Capital Division, both of which were headquartered in Kabul, which was now surrounded by the Taliban. On 15 August 2021, the Taliban entered the outskirts of Kabul from multiple directions, beginning the fall of Kabul. On the same day, President Ashraf Ghani fled the country to Dubai. It was reported that ANA soldiers were fleeing to neighbouring countries in droves, some on foot and others onboard Afghan Air Force aircraft. At 8:55 pm local time, Taliban forces seized the Arg and raised their flag, soon afterwards declaring the restoration of the Islamic Emirate of Afghanistan.

Formation of the Taliban government and international recognition 

On 7 September 2021, an interim government headed by Mohammad Hassan Akhund as Prime Minister was declared by the Taliban.  The Taliban also requested to sent a new envoy to the UN to represent Afghanistan in the future. If accepted, it would be a milestone towards international recognition. This, however, appears unlikely due to the economic collapse and political infighting that soon engulfed the recently reestablished emirate.

According to a Human Rights Watch's report released in November 2021, the Taliban killed or forcibly disappeared more than 100 former members of the Afghan security forces in the three months since the takeover in just the four provinces of Ghazni, Helmand, Kandahar, and Kunduz. According to the report, the Taliban identified targets for arrest and execution through intelligence operations and access to employment records that were left behind. Former members of the security forces were also killed by the Taliban within days of registering with them to receive a letter guaranteeing their safety.

Panjshir conflict 

On 17 August 2021, Vice President Amrullah Saleh, citing provisions of the Constitution of Afghanistan, declared himself President of Afghanistan from a base of operations in the Panjshir Valley, which had not been taken by Taliban forces, and vowed to continue military operations against the Taliban from there. His claim to the presidency was endorsed by Ahmad Massoud and Islamic Republic of Afghanistan Minister of Defence Bismillah Khan Mohammadi. The Panjshir-based resistance recaptured the provincial capital of Charikar on 17 August 2021. By 6 September the Taliban had regained control over most of the valley, but armed resistance continued  in the upper valleys. Clashes in the valley mostly ceased by mid-September. The leaders of the resistance, Saleh and Massoud reportedly fled to neighboring Tajikistan in late September.

Islamic State activity 

Following the 2021 Kabul airport attack conducted by the terrorist group Islamic State of Iraq and the Levant – Khorasan Province (a branch of the ISIL), the US and the Taliban have mutually agreed together to fight against the ISIS terrorists in the International military intervention against ISIL.

Since the U.S. withdrawal from Afghanistan, Islamic State's affiliate's attacks in Afghanistan have surged, particularly on minorities such as Hazaras. In 2021, Afghanistan suffered large number of casualties and top the list issued after a global survey of Islamic State casualties. As of September 2022, about thirteen attacks against Hazaras have been attributed to Islamic State.

War crimes

In October 2021, the chief prosecutor of the International Criminal Court, Karim Ahmad Khan, indicated that they will open cases related to war crimes in Afghanistan. The court will not investigate alleged crimes by the U.S. and its allies, due to a law enacted by the U.S. called American Service-Members' Protection Act and bilateral treaties with friendly countries, which protects U.S. military personnel from international prosecution.

Humanitarian crisis 
Following the Taliban takeover, western nations suspended humanitarian aid and the World Bank and International Monetary Fund also halted payments to Afghanistan. The Biden administration froze about $9 billion in assets belonging to the Afghan central banks, blocking the Taliban from accessing billions of dollars held in US bank accounts.

In October, the UN stated that more than half of Afghanistan's 39 million people faced an acute food shortage. According to The New York Times, "the crisis is, in large part, American-made, imposed by deliberate policy choices with results that were predicted months in advance." They also cited factors such as drought, which has damaged food production, and the fighting during the Taliban takeover, which has disrupted basic services and displaced many to cities. On October 20, Taliban's chief spokesman Zabihullah Mujahid told CBS News that "On the one hand they say a million children will die, but on the other, the US are holding our money. The US should release our money so we can save more children."

On 11 November 2021, the Human Rights Watch reported that Afghanistan is facing widespread famine due to collapsed economy and broken banking system. The UN World Food Program has also issued multiple warnings of worsening food insecurity. World leaders pledged $1.2 billion in humanitarian aid to Afghanistan.

On 22 December 2021, The United Nations Security Council unanimously adopted a US-proposed resolution to help humanitarian aid reach desperate Afghans, while seeking to keep funds out of Taliban hands. The Under-Secretary-General for Humanitarian Affairs, Martin Griffiths, described the council's passage of resolution 2615 (2021) as “evidence of how seriously Member States take the shocking levels of need and suffering in the country.”

Support in form of wheat has been provided by various countries, including India.

Economic crisis
An already fragile economy worsened further in the aftermath. Due to sanctions and high energy prices, poverty level has increased in the country. An economic crisis brewed in the country when the United States decided to freeze Da Afghanistan Bank's, the central bank of Afghanistan, assets of $9.5bn. This increased selling pressure on its currency, Afghan afghani, and it extended a significant drop in value. An already broken banking system has collapsed further and has given rise to the hawala and related crimes in the country. About 80 percent Afghans are facing debt due to this economic crisis.

References

Afghanistan
War in Afghanistan (2001–2021)